Archie "Gunslinger" Cooley (born 1940) is a former college football coach.  He served as the head football coach at Mississippi Valley State University from 1980 to 1986, University of Arkansas–Pine Bluff from 1987 to 1991, Norfolk State University in 1993, and Paul Quinn College from 2000 to 2006. At Mississippi Valley State, Cooley coached Jerry Rice, future Pro Football Hall of Fame wide receiver.

Early life
Cooley was born and Sumrall, Mississippi and raised in Laurel, Mississippi, where he attended Oak Park High School. He played college football at Jackson State University under John Merritt. Cooley graduated in 1962.

Coaching career
Cooley began his coaching career at Southside High School in Heidelberg, Mississippi, where he worked for seven years.  From  1971 to 1973 he was a linebacker and defensive line coach at Alcorn State University.  Cooley moved to Tennessee State University in 1974 as a linebacker coach.

The success Cooley achieved at Mississippi Valley State is attributed to his design of his innovative "Satellite Express" passing offense, which was a no huddle offense featuring five wide receivers.  Cooley led the Mississippi Valley State Delta Devils to their only Division I-AA playoff appearance in 1984. The 1984 Mississippi Valley State Delta Devils football team set different passing, receiving, and scoring records that featured Jerry Rice and quarterback Willie Totten. To this day, Cooley is the winningest coach in the history of the Delta Devil football program. He also served as an associate professor of physical education at Mississippi Valley State.

In 1987 Cooley moved on to University of Arkansas at Pine Bluff, which was then an NAIA member before the school moved up to the Southwestern Athletic Conference (SWAC) in the 1990s. He coached there for four years, from 1987 to 1990, and served as athletic director and associate professor.

In 1993, Cooley was hired as head coach at Norfolk State University, where he stayed for only one year.

After a long hiatus from the coaching scene, Cooley returned when he became head coach at Paul Quinn College located in Dallas, Texas. Paul Quinn was an NAIA member school which was then establishing a new football program, and Cooley was responsible for starting the program from the ground up. He served as head coach from 2000 to 2006. The school was experiencing financial and accreditation issues and its administration decided to drop the football program after the 2006 season.

In 2007, Cooley was inducted into the Southwestern Athletic Conference Hall of Fame

Head coaching record

College

References

1940 births
Living people
American football centers
American football linebackers
Alcorn State Braves football coaches
Arkansas–Pine Bluff Golden Lions athletic directors
Arkansas–Pine Bluff Golden Lions football coaches
Jackson State Tigers football players
Mississippi Valley State Delta Devils football coaches
Norfolk State Spartans football coaches
Paul Quinn Tigers football coaches
Tennessee State Tigers football coaches
High school football coaches in Mississippi
Mississippi Valley State University faculty
University of Arkansas at Pine Bluff faculty
People from Sumrall, Mississippi
People from Laurel, Mississippi
Coaches of American football from Mississippi
Players of American football from Mississippi
African-American coaches of American football
African-American players of American football
20th-century African-American sportspeople
21st-century African-American sportspeople